The Big Brain Theory is an American television show on the Discovery Channel that first aired in 2013, hosted by Kal Penn. Eight episodes were produced.

Format 
Each week the contestants enter the blueprint challenge, where they are given 30 minutes to solve an engineering problem using only an electronic blackboard. The 2 contestants with the best solutions are chosen by the judges to be the leaders of the blue team and the red team, who now have to build a working solution. The team leaders pick their members one by one, and they are given a certain time and budget to finish the task; workshop time is limited to 12 hours a day.

Their builds are then tested and the team that fails will face elimination. If both teams fail then nobody is safe from elimination. The judges will determine who leaves the competition. Once eliminated, one competitor can get back in if he/she wins the wild card, decided by the judges.

The winner of the competition gets US$50,000 and a one-year contract to work for WET Enterprises, founded by Mark Fuller. Contestants who have been eliminated cannot participate in the blueprint challenge any more, but they can still be picked for the teams and are eligible for the Judges' Prize, which is US$20,000.

Judges 
In addition to the full judges, there is always a third guest judge that changes every week. The two full judges are:
 Mark Fuller, founder and CEO of WET Enterprises
 Christine Gulbranson, founder and CEO of Christalis

Overview

Contestants 
 Winner: Corey Fleischer, mechanical engineer
 Runner-up: Amy Elliott, engineering grad student
 Judges' Prize: Tom Johnson, mechanical engineer
 Eric Whitman, robotics grad student
 Andrew Stroup, defense systems engineer
 Dan Moyers, space systems engineer
 Gui Cavalcanti, robotics engineer
 Alison Wong, product designer
 Joel Ifill, welding engineer
 Joe Caravella, rocket scientist

Bold denotes team captain.

Episodes

References

External links 
 
 

2013 American television series debuts
English-language television shows
Discovery Channel original programming
2013 American television series endings